Jack Dailey Creek is a stream in the U.S. state of South Dakota.

Jack Dailey Creek has the name of Jack Dailey, a pioneer settler.

See also
List of rivers of South Dakota

References

Rivers of Haakon County, South Dakota
Rivers of South Dakota